

Ships in class 
The following 156 vessels were built as part of the Clemson class (a further 6 vessels, DD-200 to DD-205 authorized on 6 October 1917, were cancelled on 3 February 1919 without being named). The ships were authorized in the following batches:

 Hull numbers DD-186–DD-199: authorized 6 October 1917 (contract for 20 ships awarded to Newport News Shipbuilding, but last 6 cancelled)
 Hull numbers DD-206–DD-230: authorized 6 October 1917 (contract for 25 ships awarded to William Cramp and Sons)
 Hull numbers DD-231–DD-250: authorized 6 October 1917 (contract for 20 ships awarded to New York Shipbuilding)
 Hull numbers DD-251–DD-295: authorized 6 October 1917 (contract for 10 ships awarded to Bethlehem, Quincy; and for 35 ships to Bethlehem, Squantum)
 Hull numbers DD-296–DD-335: authorized 6 October 1917 (contract for 40 ships awarded to Union Iron Works)
 Hull numbers DD-336–DD-344: authorized 4 March 1917 (contract for 6 ships awarded to Mare Island Navy Yard; and for 3 ships to Norfolk Navy Yard)
 Hull numbers DD-345–DD-347: authorized 26 April 1917 (contract for 3 ships awarded to Bath Iron Works)

References

"Clemson class destroyers" uboat.net